Robert Forsythe (27 February 1925 - 19 May 2016) was a Northern Irish former professional footballer who played as an outside right.

Career
Born in Belfast, Forsythe played for Ballymoney United and Bradford City.

For Bradford City he made 1 appearance in the Football League.

Sources

References

1925 births
2016 deaths
Association footballers from Northern Ireland
Ballymoney United F.C. players
Bradford City A.F.C. players
English Football League players
Association football outside forwards